KBUs Pokalturnering (unofficial English translation: KBU Cup, Copenhagen Cup) was a Danish regional knockout association football competition contested annually from 1910 to 1953 by clubs that were members of the regional football association Copenhagen FA (KBU). Organised by and named after KBU, the competition rules has varied from being open to all Copenhagen clubs (1910–1919 and 1947–1953) and being a closed tournament (1920–1946) reserved only for the highest ranking clubs, and as a consequence the number of participants have varied greatly throughout its history. For the first 10 seasons, between 7 and 13 teams participated until a fixed number of 8 teams was introduced from 1920 until 1946. When both the Sommerpokalturneringen (who for several seasons had functioned as a qualifying tournament) and the KBUs B-Pokalturnering, both featuring the lower ranking KBU teams, were discontinued after their 1946 edition, the Copenhagen FA again allowed lower ranking clubs to participate in the association's primary cup competition, increasing the number of teams to 52. For the most part, the competition took place in the fall season (6 seasons ended in the following spring season) and since the 1913 edition culminating in a final played at Københavns Idrætspark that saw large attendance figures and generated much media coverage.

Due to a conflict regarding majority voting at KBU, the top four field-owning clubs (Baneklubberne) of the era did not participate in the 1911 edition of the cup, that only had the non-field-owning clubs (Fælledklubberne) participating. Instead they formed their own cup tournament that fall season, Baneklubberne Cup in the fall of 1911, until returning to the tournament the following spring season. The cup tournament was discontinued after the 1953 edition due to the introduction of the nationwide Danish Cup in 1954. In the 44 tournaments held, a total of 66 clubs participated, only 10 teams took part in the finals, 9 teams secured a cup victory, 743 matches were played and 3,723 goals scored. The most successful club in the history of the tournament were Østerbro-based B.93, who won a total of 13 cup titles and appeared as a losing finalist on 11 occasions.

Trophy and prizes 
Each year, the winning team was presented with the cup trophy. Four trophies were distributed during the tournament's duration. A club had to win five finals in total, also known as lots, to keep the trophy permanently. Due to a conflict, the 1911 tournament did not have the participation of the best clubs in the highest Copenhagen Football League, who owned their own ground. The clubs participated with reserve teams in the 1914 edition due to many of the first squad players being summoned by the Danish mobilization at the outbreak of World War I, so it was decided that the cup trophy would not be in play, and hence Kjøbenhavns Boldklub did not gain a lot this year by winning the final match for the fifth time in the tournament's history. Three clubs have earned this honour: the 1st trophy by B 1903 in 1924, 2nd trophy by B.93 in 1932, 3rd trophy by Akademisk BK in 1949, while the fourth and last trophy was kept by the Copenhagen FA. On some occasions, the runners-up would receive a commemorative plaque for their participation in the final.

Finals

Results by team
Teams shown in italics are no longer in existence. B.93 won the first and last edition, won the most final matches and lost the largest number of final matches.

References 

KBUs Pokalturnering
Defunct football cup competitions in Denmark
1910 establishments in Denmark